Elections to Oxford City Council were held on 6 May 1999. One third of the councils seats were up for election.  The Labour party kept its overall majority on the council. The number of Councillors for each party after the election were Labour 28, Liberal Democrat 16 and Green 7.  Overall turnout was 29.2%

Election result

|}

Ward results

See also
1999 United Kingdom local elections
Elections in the United Kingdom

References

1999
1999 English local elections
20th century in Oxford